Hernán Sánchez Castillo (born ) is a Colombian male  track cyclist, and part of the national team. He competed in the team sprint event at the 2009 UCI Track Cycling World Championships.

References

External links
 Profile at cyclingarchives.com

1984 births
Living people
Colombian track cyclists
Colombian male cyclists
Place of birth missing (living people)
Pan American Games medalists in cycling
Pan American Games bronze medalists for Colombia
Cyclists at the 2007 Pan American Games
Medalists at the 2007 Pan American Games
20th-century Colombian people
21st-century Colombian people
Competitors at the 2006 Central American and Caribbean Games